Tejeda is a municipality in the island of Gran Canaria, Spain.

Tejeda may also refer to:

People
Adalberto Tejeda Olivares (1883–1960), Mexican politician, who served two terms as Governor of Veracruz
Altaír Tejeda de Tamez (born 1922), Mexican writer
Anay Tejeda (born 1983), Cuban hurdler
Carlos Tejeda (born 1980), Venezuelan volleyball player
Frank Tejeda (1945–1997), decorated United States Marine and politician
Gladys Tejeda (born 1985), Peruvian long-distance runner
Robinson Tejeda (born 1982), Dominican professional baseball player
Sebastián Lerdo de Tejada (born 1823), jurist and ex-president of Mexico
Yeltsin Tejeda (born 1992), Costa Rican footballer

Places
Camarón de Tejeda, a town in Veracruz, Mexican
Camarón de Tejeda (municipality), a municipality in Veracruz, Mexican
Chicontepec de Tejeda, a municipality in Veracruz, Mexican
Sierra de Tejeda, a mountain range in Andalusia, Spain
Tejeda de Tiétar, a municipality in Cáceres, Extremadura, Spain
Tejeda y Segoyuela, a municipality in Salamanca, Castile and León, Spain

See also
Tejada (disambiguation)
Tejedor, a surname
Tejera (disambiguation)